Alfred McCullough (born July 16, 1989) is an American football offensive lineman who is currently a free agent. He played college football at the University of Alabama and attended Athens High School in Athens, Alabama. He was a member of the Baltimore Ravens, Philadelphia Eagles, and Tampa Bay Storm.

Early years
McCullough played high school football for the Athens High School Golden Eagles. He was named to The Birmingham News Super All-State Team and earned first-team Class 5A All-State honors from the Birmingham News. He was named Class 5A Most Valuable Lineman by the Alabama Sports Writers Association, helping the Golden Eagles advance to the Class 5A Alabama State Championship his senior year. McCullough totaled 61 tackles and 12 sacks as a senior. He compiled 67 tackles, 11 sacks, 16 tackles for loss and six pass breakups his junior season. He was an All-Region 8 selection and Alabama Class 5A, Region 8 Player of the Year his junior year in 2005. McCullough was also a first-team All-Area selection by the Decatur Daily.

College career
McCullough played for the Alabama Crimson Tide from 2007 to 2011, playing in 31 games while starting six. He was redshirted in 2008. The Crimson Tide won the national championship in 2009 and 2011.

Professional career

Baltimore Ravens
McCullough signed with the Baltimore Ravens on April 29, 2012 after going undrafted in the 2012 NFL Draft.

Philadelphia Eagles
McCullough was signed by the Philadelphia Eagles on May 17, 2012. He was released by the Eagles on August 25, 2012.

Tampa Bay Storm
McCullough signed with the Tampa Bay Storm on January 30, 2013. He started all fourteen games he played for the Storm his rookie year in 2013. He also played in fourteen games in 2014. McCullough became a free agent after the 2015 season. On December 1, 2015, McCullough was assigned to the Storm for the 2015 season. On June 6, 2016, McCullough was placed on reassignment.

Arizona Rattlers
On June 7, 2016, McCullough was claimed off reassignment by the Arizona Rattlers.

References

External links
Just Sports Stats
College stats

Living people
1989 births
Players of American football from Alabama
American football offensive linemen
African-American players of American football
Alabama Crimson Tide football players
Tampa Bay Storm players
People from Athens, Alabama
Arizona Rattlers players
21st-century African-American sportspeople
20th-century African-American people